Two Hands: The Leon Fleisher Story is a 2006 American short documentary film directed by Nathaniel Kahn. It was nominated for an Academy Award for Best Documentary Short.  It tells the story of the pianist Leon Fleisher. Due to a neurological condition called focal dystonia, he lost the use of his right hand for some time, and performed using only his left hand. After years, he regained the use of his right hand and resumed two-hand performances.

References

External links

2006 films
2006 short documentary films
American short documentary films
American independent films
Films directed by Nathaniel Kahn
Documentary films about classical music and musicians
Films about pianos and pianists
Documentary films about people with disability
2006 independent films
2000s English-language films
2000s American films